Dippenaar is a surname. Notable people with the surname include:

Boeta Dippenaar (born 1977), South African cricketer
Lauritz Dippenaar (born 1948), South African businessman, investor, and banker
Stephan Dippenaar (born 1988), South African rugby union footballer

See also
 Dippenaaria